Alice Smith (born 30 November 1977) is an American singer and songwriter, her style anchored in rock, R&B, blues, jazz and soul.

Life and career
Raised between Washington, D.C. and a farm in Georgia, she sang in Moomtez and Black Rock Coalition while studying History at Fordham University. Releasing her first album in 2006, and Rolling Stone said of her, "Smith could easily be lumped in with expressive chanteuses like Norah Jones and Alicia Keys, but she has a broader palette than either." The magazine listed her as one of the 10 Artists to Watch in 2006.

Her debut album, For Lovers, Dreamers & Me, was a collection of songs spanning genres from country to rock to funk. The title was borrowed from  the Muppets. "We were just trying to think of a title because I haven’t thought of a name after it was all done," she said in an interview with Hiphoprnbsoul.com. "We were thinking about the music and we were throwing ideas around. We were thinking about The Beatles and The Wizard of Oz and whatever else made us think of. Then something made me think of The Muppets. I don’t even know. It wasn't something in the forefront of my mind. I just thought of it and it came to me like that."

The song "Dream" was featured on an episode of Entourage (season four) during the closing credits. "Dream" was also featured in the final act of episode four, season five, of the Showtime series The L Word ("Let's Get This Party Started"). In 2007, she was nominated for a Grammy Award under the Best Urban/Alternative category. However, the fall-out from pressure of the success of her debut release meant that future recordings were shelved. Becoming a mother, Smith relocated from New York to Los Angeles, California.

In 2011, she collaborated with Aloe Blacc to contribute the track "Baby" to the Red Hot Organization's most recent charitable album Red Hot + Rio 2. The album is a follow-up to the 1996 Red Hot + Rio. Proceeds from the sales will be donated to raise awareness and money to fight AIDS/HIV and related health and social issues.

Her second album, She was released in March 2013.

In 2013 Alice performed the song "Cry" with Doyle Bramhall II at Madison Square Gardens as part of the Eric Clapton Crossroads Guitar Festival.

In 2014, Prince released an interpretation of her song Another Love on his album with 3rdeyegirl, Plectrumelectrum. She also performed "Fool For You", "The One", "She", and "Don't Get Me Wrong", and "Dreams" at AfroPunk 2014.

In 2015, Smith's cover of "I Put a Spell on You" was featured on Nina Revisited... A Tribute to Nina Simone.

In 2018, Smith's song "Fool For You" was featured in the Season 4 episode One of My Three Soups of the TV series Gotham, which chronicles the events leading up to Batman's arrival.

She released Mystery, her third album, comprising seven songs, in October 2019.

Personal life
Smith has one daughter, and is married to recording artist Citizen Cope.

Discography

Studio albums

References

Reviews
Giant Step - For Lovers, Dreamers & Me / Alice Smith
Sound Generator - For Lovers, Dreamers & Me / Alice Smith
Rainbow Network - For Lovers, Dreamers & Me / Alice Smith
Music Emissions - For Lovers, Dreamers & Me / Alice Smith

External links
 Alice Smith Official site

1978 births
Living people
American soul musicians
Singers from New York City
Georgetown Visitation Preparatory School alumni
American women rock singers
African-American women singer-songwriters
American soul singers
American contemporary R&B singers
21st-century African-American women singers
Singer-songwriters from New York (state)
Singer-songwriters from Washington, D.C.